Habiluim (Hebrew: "הבילויים", a name given to people who took part in the Bilu organization) is an Israeli, theatrical rock and polka band formed in 1996 by Noam Enbar (bass and vocals) and Yammi Wisler (electric guitar) as a reaction to the deep sense of abhorrence they felt listening to contemporary Israeli pop music, which they viewed as a means of escape from the harsh Israeli reality. 

The band's songs are grotesque accounts of the Israeli life from a political, social and critical point of view. 
In their song "Shaul Mofaz" the former minister of defense (Shaul Mofaz) is riding a snow sledge from house to house, giving out amputated organs of dead soldiers to their bereaved families. "Etzot Me'Imma" (Motherly Advice) is a mother's recommendation to her daughter to have an abortion, so her life won't be ruined by the need to raise a child, like her mother's was when she was born.

The grim contents of the band's songs are often accompanied by lively dancing music, drawing from the klezmer sounds of the Jewish ghetto, combined with Russian and Balkan folk music, and inspired by composers such as Kurt Weill and Hanns Eisler.

In 2002 the band was joined by pianist Maya Dunietz, and the band was signed by a major Israeli label, NMC Music. Habiluim recorded their first album (self titled), produced by Berry Sakharof (Minimal Compact). The album won critical acclaim and commercial success. Soon afterwards the band was joined by Yoni Silver (violin, saxophones). Throughout the years, several drummers have joined the band, including Shlomi (Kruvi) Lavi and Shahar Haziza. The band also included scratcher DJ Ofer (Schoolmaster) Tal, accordionist Assaf Talmudi and brass player Eyal Talmudi.

In 2006 Habiluim recorded their second album "Bereavement and Failure" ("שכול וכישלון" shchol vekishalon), inspired by the novel of Yosef Haim Brenner by the same name. the album was recorded in New York City, produced by Tamir Muskat (Balkan Beat Box), and released in August 2007, also by NMC. The album enjoyed great critical and public acclaim. In an interview in October 2007, Enbar and Wisler characterized the album as a soundtrack to a fictional musical, transposing Brenner's novel into a contemporary setting.

Discography

Now Be Our Slaves (1996)

Habiluim (2003)

Shchol Vekishalon (Bereavement and Failure) (2007)

Hora Haslama! (2013) (!הורה הסלמה)

References

 https://www.haaretz.com/1.4990736
 http://www.mako.co.il/music-Magazine/articles/Article-748926c9c549e31006.htm
 http://e.walla.co.il/item/2643755
 http://www.mouse.co.il/CM.articles_item,729,209,14524,.aspx
 http://www.haaretz.co.il/gallery/1.1432758
 https://www.haaretz.co.il/gallery/1.1432758

External links
 Bandcamp page

Israeli rock music groups